Oxylamia is a genus of longhorn beetles of the subfamily Lamiinae, containing the following species:

subgenus Cordoxylamia
 Oxylamia cordifer (Chevrolat, 1856)

subgenus Oxylamia
 Oxylamia basilewskyi Breuning, 1975
 Oxylamia binigrovitticollis Breuning, 1969
 Oxylamia biplagiata (Breuning, 1935)
 Oxylamia flavoguttata (Breuning, 1935)
 Oxylamia fulvaster (Jordan, 1894)
 Oxylamia ochreostictica (Breuning, 1940)

subgenus Pseudoxylamia
 Oxylamia tepahius (Dillon & Dillon, 1959)
 Oxylamia trianguligera (Aurivillius, 1917)

References

Lamiini